The U.S. state of Colorado has had a system of direct voting since gaining statehood in 1877. Citizens and the Colorado General Assembly both have the ability to place new legislation, legislation recently passed by the General Assembly, and constitutional amendments on the ballot for a popular vote. Colorado has three types of ballot measures that can be voted on in a statewide election: initiatives, referendums, and legislatively-referred measures. In order to be placed on the ballot, supporters of a measure must gather signatures from registered voters. From 1877 to 1910, the only ballot measures allowed were legislatively-referred measures. In 1910, Referendum 3 was placed on the ballot by the General Assembly and passed, creating a citizen-led process for initiatives and referendums. The first successful citizen-initiated measures were passed in 1912.

Background 

The 1876 Constitution of Colorado included procedures for the General Assembly to place measures on the ballot in a statewide election. In the 1890s, a grassroots movement to increase citizen power began, culminating in a special session of the legislature to discuss initiative and referendums in 1910. That session resulted in 1910's Referendum 3, which passed with over 76% of the vote and created a citizen-initiated process. From 1877 to 2016, constitutional amendments required only a simple majority to pass. In 2016, Amendment 71 passed and raised the threshold to 55%. In 2020, as part of his administration's response to the COVID-19 pandemic, Governor Jared Polis issued an emergency rule allowing petition signature gatherers to do so via email and mail, rather than in-person efforts. The change, while upheld by the Denver District Court, was overturned by the Colorado Supreme Court later that year.

After the 1876 constitutional convention in Colorado, a legislatively-referred constitutional amendment which would have granted women the right to vote was placed on the ballot for the 1877 election. The measure failed, with over two-thirds of voters voting against it. Henry Blackwell, a founder of the American Woman Suffrage Association, summed up the unsuccessful campaign by saying "Woman Suffrage can never be carried by a popular vote without a political party behind it". Blackwell was proven correct in 1893 when, in part due to gains made by the Colorado People's Party in the General Assembly, voters supported a women's suffrage ballot measure by a 54-45 margin.

In 1970, The International Olympic Committee granted Denver hosting rights for the 1976 Winter Olympics. Governor John Love claimed that the games would cost taxpayers only $5,000,000. Activists quickly noted a wide variety of issues with the state's cost estimate, however, including a lack of transportation infrastructure, no planning for the Olympic Village, and issues with planned events sites. A petition for 1972's Measure 8 quickly reached the necessary 51,000 signatures and nearly 60% of Coloradans voted to prohibit the state from funding the Olympics. Later estimates found that the cost for Denver to host the games would have been $92,000,000, over 18 times the state's estimate. Richard Lamm, who was a leader in the local anti-Olympics movement, would later parlay his fame from the measure into three-terms as Governor.

1984's Amendment 3, which barred the use of state funds for abortion services, passed by less than one percentage point. The measure gave Colorado the distinction of being both the first state to decriminalize abortion, having done so in 1967, and the first state to prohibit the government from funding it. 1990's Amendment 5 has been credited by the Initiative & Referendum Institute as having started the term limits movement in the United States and was followed by similar initiatives in 1994 and 1996. Colorado's efforts were unique because they placed term limits on members of Congress in addition to state-level officials. The term-limits movement would result in the Supreme Court case U.S. Term Limits, Inc. v. Thornton, which determined that states could not place restrictions on congresspeople beyond the constitutional requirements.

In 2006, Amendment 20 passed with 54% of the vote and legalized the medical use of marijuana in the state. It was followed by 2012's Amendment 64, which passed by similar margins and legalized the recreational use of marijuana. The Economist described the vote as "an electoral first not only for America but for the world." Colorado continued this trend of loosening drug policy in 2022 when voters passed Proposition 122 and legalized the use of psilocybin mushrooms in designated "healing centers".

Types of ballot measures

Citizen-initiated 
The Constitution of Colorado grants citizens some initiative and referendum powers in Article V. In order for a measure to be placed on the ballot, a petition must receive signatures equal to 5% of the votes cast in the previous election. The governor's veto power does not extend to citizen-initiated measures, which go into effect within one month of election returns being certified.

 Initiatives create new state statutes or constitutional amendments. They may be placed on the ballot if their petition is filed at least three months before the upcoming election.
 Referendums repeal legislation passed in the previous General Assembly session. They may be placed on the ballot if their petition is filed at least 90 days after the previous General Assembly session adjourns.

Government-initiated 
At the General Assembly's discretion, the legislature may place additional measures on the ballot. Article XIX of the Constitution requires that constitutional amendments passed by the legislature be voted on in the next general election. The General Assembly can also vote to place statute changes and proposed spending on the general election ballot.

1800s

1877

1880

1881

1882

1884

1886

1887

1888

1890

1892

1893

1894

1896

1900-1949

1900

1902

1904

1906

1908

1910

1912

1914

1916

1918

1920

1922

1924

1926

1928

1930

1932

1934

1936

1938

1940

1942

1944

1946

1948

1950-1999

1950

1952

1954

1956

1958

1960

1962

1964

1966

1968

1970

1972

1974

1976

1978

1980

1982

1984

1986

1988

1990

1992

1993

1994

1995

1996

1997

1998

1999

2000-

2000

2001

2002

2003

2004

2005

2006

2008

2010

2011

2012

2013

2014

2015

2016

2018

2019

2020

2021

2022

Notes

References

Ballot measures
Ballot measures
United States law-related lists
Lists of referendums